This is a list of law schools in Massachusetts, arranged in alphabetical order.

In addition, Tufts University has a school of Law and Diplomacy, which, besides offering M.A. and Ph.D. degrees in Law and Diplomacy (international affairs), offers an LL.M. in international law.

Former law schools

References

External links
U.S. News & World Report Ranking of Law Schools

 
Massachusetts
Law schools
Law schools